Czesław Warsewicz (born 1969) is a Polish businessman and entrepreneur.

Education
Warsewicz graduated in economics from Warsaw School of Economics in 1994 and from IESE Business School (Advanced Management Program, 2007).

Business career
He took part in the privatisation of a few Polish companies, and before starting his job with PKP Intercity he was the CFO in Rolimpex-Nasiona Sp. z o.o. (1998 – 2006). 
In the years 2006 - 2009, the President of the PKP Intercity SA Management Board. Currently, the President of the Management Board of a strategic consulting company under the name "Blue Ocean" Business Consulting sp. O.o., specializing in the development of transport plans for local government units. Member of the Law and Justice Program Council responsible for preparing the program in the field of transport, in particular rail.

Since March 2018 CEO PKP Cargo S.A.

Awards and commendations
 2009 Wektor-Award of Konfederacji Pracodawców Polskich.

References 

Polish State Railways people
Living people
SGH Warsaw School of Economics alumni
Polish economists
1969 births
Polish businesspeople
Polish chief executives